Halysidota ruscheweyhi is a moth of the family Erebidae. It was described by Harrison Gray Dyar Jr. in 1912. It is found in Argentina, Uruguay and Paraguay.

References

 Arctiidae genus list at Butterflies and Moths of the World of the Natural History Museum

Halysidota
Moths described in 1912